Yogendra Puranik ( Puraniku Yogendora, ; born 3 June 1977), commonly referred to as Yogi, is an Indian-born Japanese politician and the first person of Indian origin to win an election in Japan. He was elected to the Tokyo's Edogawa City assembly as City Councillor in April 2019. He was supported by the Constitutional Democratic Party of Japan.

In April 2022, Yogi was appointed as the Principal of  https://www.tsuchiura1-h.ibk.ed.jp/ in Ibraraki prefecture, thus making him the first-ever foreign-origin principal of a public (government) school in Japan, and first-ever Indian-origin Civil/Gazetted officer in Japan. During the first year, he will take a handover acting as the vice principal. His school consists of high school, junior high school, and part-timers, with over 1100 students and 100 teachers. The school is one of the top-rated schools in Japan.

Childhood 
Yogi was born in Ambarnath, in the suburbs of Mumbai, India, on 3 June 1977. Rekha Puranik, his mother, worked as a stitch and teacher and Sharad Puranik, his father, worked as a machinist in the Ordnance Factory in Ambarnath. Puranik has an elder sister named Nilima Potnis and a younger brother named Rahul Puranik.

Education 
Yogi started his schooling at Kendriya Vidyalaya (Central School) in Ambarnath. In the middle of 11th grade, his father was transferred to Pune, following which Yogi joined Kendriya Vidyalaya Southern Command and later passed the high school at Kendriya Vidyalaya Dehu Road in 1994. He then joined the Sir Parashurambhau College under the Pune University to study an undergraduate program in science (Bachelor of Science) with specializations in physics and mathematics. He also joined the Foreign Languages Department (Ranade Institute) of Pune University to study Japanese and German, and Datamatics Corporation, a private information technology school, to study computer science.

Yogi graduated with a diploma in information technology in May 1996 and an advanced diploma in Japanese language in May 1997. He was awarded the Study Tour award, a scholarship from the Japan Foundation under the Ministry of Foreign Affairs, to visit Japan for a month in September 1997. This was when Yogi began his interest in Japan. He was awarded another scholarship by the Japan Foundation to study in Japan for an academic year in September 1999.

Yogi later left his studies in science and completed his bachelor's and master's degrees in international and labor economics from Pune University. He finished an International Business Management program from the Indian Institute of Management, Calcutta, with a focus on strategies for doing global business. He attended the Skema Business School (previously known as ESC Lille) in France to study strategic project management including qualitative and quantitative analysis methods and research techniques.

Work 
In April 1996, Yogi started working for a small-scale IT company in Pune called Sutra Systems. He was also associated with Geometric Software solutions, Mahindra British Telecom, and Keihin FIE Private Limited before moving to Japan in 2001. In Japan, he worked for the information technology companies Infosys Technologies Limited, Fujifilm, and Polaris Software Lab Limited before moving to Mizuho Bank in 2010 as vice president of operations strategy. Since then, Yogi has been in the banking field. His last position was at Rakuten Bank as vice director of corporate planning where he managed departments for business planning, budget planning, business automation, fraud detection, and legal affairs, before taking the position of city councilor.

Family 
Yogi married Zhang Zhe, a professor of Japanese, in August 2001. They had a son, Chinmay Puranik, on 7 June 2002. Due to geographical issues, Puranik and Zhe divorced in April 2007.

Social life 
Yogi had been an active community volunteer since 2005 when he moved to Nishi Kasai, a town famous in Tokyo/Japan for its large Indian population. He became the first-ever foreign-origin director of the local residents association of Kojimacho 2chome danchi in 2006. Since then he has helped to resolve issues not only between Indians and Japanese, but also issues pertaining to other nationalities. Yogi guides people in matters related to family, education, social support, marriages, visas, and the workplace.

Yogi's community work has been covered by media and television for many years. His community work after the March 2011 Eastern Japan Earthquake was highly appreciated by the community and the media.

Around 50% of Indians left Japan in the aftermath of this earthquake. The reason was a lack of helpful information, particularly in English. The Indian Embassy also did not provide enough support. Yogi realized the need for a Japan-wide network of people and thus embarked on the journey of creating the All-Japan Association of Indians (AJAI). After prolonged discussions with many community associations and volunteers, the association was formed in late 2017 and its opening ceremony was held in February 2019. AJAI's website  has become one of the most informative websites for Indians and foreigners coming to and living in Japan. 

Yogi started the Indian Home Food Restaurant Reka  in Tokyo in February 2013 as a social venture to spread real Indian homestyle food in Japan. The restaurant has been highly popular, and has been covered by various magazines and television programmes since its inception. The restaurant also received the Edogawa City Mayors Award in 2016. 

Yogi opened his second restaurant at the end of 2016. He also established the Edogawa India Culture Center where he hosts around 50 live concerts every year, mainly around Indian classical music and dances, and collaborations with music and art from other countries. This center also hosts weekly classes for yoga, music, Indian languages, Indian culture, and Indian mythology.

Political career 
In 2016, when there was a political movement in the Edogawa district of Tokyo to create a Little India, Yogi sensed that the model was not socially healthy and sustainable, and did not take into consideration the day-to-day needs of the society or community. The objectives of the project were influenced by a small number of people. As a volunteer, he tried to convince the local administration to consider public opinion, however, his efforts were unsuccessful.

Yogi announced his candidacy in the regional elections that took place in April 2019 in Japan. He won by a large margin. He is a member of the Constitutional Democratic Party, the largest opposition party in Japan.

Yogi unsuccessfully ran to represent Edogawa in the Tokyo Metropolitan Assembly in the 2021 election, finishing in 7th place out of 8 candidates, with 9.3% (20,109)of the vote within just 1 month of campaigning.

See also

External links 
 Reka Corp, a company managed by Yogendra Puranik

References

Living people
Japanese people of Indian descent
Naturalized citizens of Japan
1977 births